Ebenezer Colls (Horstead, Norfolk, 1812 – Hampstead, 1887) was an English marine painter.

References

1812 births
1887 deaths
19th-century English painters
English male painters
19th-century English male artists